The  is a national expressway in the Tōhoku region of Japan. It is owned and operated by East Nippon Expressway Company.

Naming

The name  is a kanji acronym consisting of characters found in the former names of the provinces linked by the expressway.  consists of the eastern part of present-day Fukushima Prefecture, and  consists of present-day Niigata Prefecture.

Officially the expressway is referred to as the Tōhoku-Ōdan Expressway Iwaki Niigata Route.

Overview

The route of the expressway connects the coastlines of the Pacific Ocean and the Japan Sea by traversing the mountainous interior of the Tōhoku region.

The expressway commences at a junction with the Jōban Expressway in Iwaki, Fukushima and follows a northwesterly course to the city of Kōriyama, where it intersects with the Tōhoku Expressway. The expressway continues its course through the historic Aizu region, with Mount Bandai viewable to the north and Lake Inawashiro viewable to the south. The route then enters Niigata Prefecture and eventually terminates at a junction in Niigata City with the Hokuriku Expressway and Nihonkai-Tōhoku Expressway.

The route parallels the East Ban'etsu Line and West Ban'etsu Line of East Japan Railway Company and National Route 49 for much of its length.

The first section of the expressway was opened to traffic in 1990 and the entire route was completed in 1997. The route was originally 2 lanes only, one in each direction. However expansion to two lanes in each direction has proceeded gradually over the years. Expansion of the eastern half (between Iwaki Junction and Kōriyama Junction) was completed in 2009.

Using the Ban-etsu and Hokuriku Expressway to travel between the Tōhoku and Kinki regions is shorter and cheaper than using expressways that traverse a route via the greater Tokyo urban area.

All service areas along the route feature restaurants and shops (there are also shops at Gobyakugawa Parking Area). There are 24-hour gas stations at Abukumakōgen Service Area and Bandaisan Service Area. There is a 24-hour FamilyMart convenience store at Aganogawa Service Area (Niigata-bound only). Saiso Parking Area and Miharu Parking Area feature vending machines and toilets, while all other parking areas have only toilets.

List of interchanges and features

 IC - interchange, SIC - smart interchange, JCT - junction, SA - service area, PA - parking area, BS - bus stop, TN - tunnel, BR - bridge

References

External links 

 East Nippon Expressway Company
 JAF Drive Map

 Iwaki JCT
 Niigata-Chūō IC

Expressways in Japan
Roads in Fukushima Prefecture
Roads in Niigata Prefecture